Herman Voldemar Reier (14 May 1878 Uue-Võidu Parish – 29 October 1951 Narva) was an Estonian engineer. He was one of the pioneers of Estonian technical vocabulary.

In 1901, he graduated from Strelitz Technical School, and 1923 Tallinn Polytechnical Institute.

From 1919 to 1932, he was the rector of Tallinn Polytechnical Institute.

References

1878 births
1951 deaths
Estonian engineers